José Rodrigo Lugo Martínez (born 19 July 1997) is a Mexican professional footballer who plays as a midfielder for Dorados de Sinaloa.

References

External links
 

1997 births
Living people
Mexican footballers
Association football midfielders
Dorados de Sinaloa footballers
Ascenso MX players
Liga de Expansión MX players
Liga Premier de México players
Sportspeople from Culiacán
Footballers from Sinaloa